Duke Li of Chen (reigned 706 BC – died 700 BC) was the fourteenth ruler of the ancient Chinese state of Chen during the early Spring and Autumn period. His ancestral surname was Gui, given name Yue (躍), and Li (厲) was his posthumous name.

Yue was a son of Duke Huan of Chen, who died under strange circumstances. He was believed to have become demented and went missing in the first month of 707 BC, before his body was found sixteen days later. The uncertainty threw the state into turmoil, and Duke Huan's younger brother Chen Tuo took the opportunity to murder Duke Li's elder brother Crown Prince Mian and usurp the throne.

Yue's mother was a princess of the neighbouring State of Cai. After Chen Tuo's usurpation, the Cai army attacked Chen and killed Chen Tuo in 706 BC. The marquis of Cai then installed Yue on the Chen throne, to be known as Duke Li.

Duke Li died in 700 BC, after a reign of seven years. He was succeeded by two of his younger brothers: Lin, Duke Zhuang of Chen, and Chujiu, Duke Xuan of Chen.

Duke Li was the father of Chen Wan, who later fled to Qi, a major state to the northeast of Chen, and established the Chen (Tian) clan there. The Chen clan of Qi grew increasingly powerful over the centuries, and eventually usurped the Qi throne.

References

Bibliography

Monarchs of Chen (state)
8th-century BC Chinese monarchs
700 BC deaths